Capricieuse (or Capricious) is a solitaire card game which is played using two decks of playing cards.

Rules
The entire deck must be dealt into twelve piles of cards. Any arrangement will do, but for convenience, two rows of six piles each will be formed. During dealing, one ace and one king of each suit is removed, all of which will form the foundations. The aces are built up while the kings are built down, all by suit.

During the process of dealing the twelve piles, cards that can be built on a foundation must be built. Also, none of the twelve piles should be left out, i.e. when a card is immediately built on a foundation, the next card is dealt on the pile the previous card left.

No building is done during the process of dealing until all cards are dealt. Afterwards, the top cards of each pile are built on the foundations or on each other's piles. The cards on the piles are built on each other either up or down by suit. Building can go in both directions, but a king cannot be placed over an ace and vice versa. Only one card can be moved at a time, and any empty pile can be filled with any card.

After the player has made all the moves he can make, the piles are collected in the reverse order the piles are dealt and the process is repeated. This redeal can be done twice in the game.

The game is won when all cards end up in the foundations.

See also
 List of solitaires
 Glossary of solitaire

References
 Barry, Sheila Anne, World's Best Card Games for One
 Coops, Helen L.  100 Games of Solitaire
 Morehead, Albert H. & Mott-Smith, Geoffrey.  The Complete Book of Solitaire & Patience Games
 Moyse Jr, Alphonse. 150 Ways to play Solitaire
 Parlett, David.  The Penguin Book of Patience

Open packers
Double-deck patience card games